Ice sledge hockey at the 1998 Winter Paralympics consisted of a men's event.

Medal summary

Preliminary round
All times are local (UTC+9).

Group A

Group B

Placement round

Medal round

Bracket

Semifinals

Bronze medal game

Gold medal game

External links
 IPC

1998 Winter Paralympics events
1998
Paralympics